Alan Bones is a retired Canadian diplomat. He was previously the Canadian ambassador to Iceland. He used to be the Chargé d'affaires a.i. to Sudan.

Bones graduated from Carleton University in 1981 with a Bachelor of Arts in political science and was hired in 1987 at the Department of External Affairs. Bones has held numerous diplomatic positions including Malaysia and Mexico.  He was also senior policy advisor to Canada's Special Envoy to the Sudan Peace Process and served as the ambassador to Sudan between 2005 and 2007.

Sources

External links 
 Foreign Affairs and International Trade Canada Complete List of Posts

|
|

Canadian diplomats
Carleton University alumni
Living people
Place of birth missing (living people)
Year of birth missing (living people)
Ambassadors of Canada to Sudan
Ambassadors of Canada to Iceland